Eugen Almer (born 14 January 1953) is a Romanian former swimmer. He competed in the men's 1500 metre freestyle at the 1972 Summer Olympics.

References

External links
 

1953 births
Living people
Romanian male freestyle swimmers
Olympic swimmers of Romania
Swimmers at the 1972 Summer Olympics
Sportspeople from Reșița